St Winnow's Church, St Winnow is a Grade I listed parish church in the Church of England in St Winnow, Cornwall.

History

The church is probably built n the site of the 7th century oratory of St Winnoc. A stone church was built in the 12th century, probably cruciform in plan, and there are traces of the Norman stonework on the north side. The transept arch was reconstructed in the 13th century.  About 1465 the south wall was demolished and the south aisle, arcade and roofs built.

The chancel was restored by John Dando Sedding between 1873 and 1874.  A new Polyphant Stone window was put in the chancel end, with a stained glass window featuring the crucifixion and bearing the inscription Absit ut glorier nisi in cruce (May I glory in nothing but the cross). Two new Polyphant Stone windows were inserted in the nave. The chancel was roofed with oak, and stalls were fitted. It was laid with encaustic and glazed tiles. The nave was reseated in pitch-pine. The rood screen was restored and fixed on the south side of the chancel. It was reopened for worship by the Lord Bishop of Exeter Rt. Revd. Frederick Temple on 11 April 1874.

Fittings
There is stained glass of c.1500 in the east windows of the chancel and south aisle.  The 16th century rood screen, carved with leaves and flowers, was restored by the Misses Rashleigh Pinwell of Plymouth in 1907 and rededicated at the Harvest Festival of that year.

The granite font, carved with angels bearing shields, is 14th century. The pulpit is of c.1600 and richly carved.  There are also carved bench ends of various dates from 1485 to 1630.

Monuments
William Sawle, d. 1651.

Parish status
The church is in a joint benefice with:
Boconnoc Church
St Mary the Virgin's Church, Braddock
St Cyricius and St Julietta's Church, St Veep
St Brevita’s Church, Lanlivery
St Nectan’s Chapel, St Winnow
St Bartholomew's Church, Lostwithiel

Organ
The organ has one manual and pedals, with 9 speaking stops. A specification of the organ can be found in the National Pipe Organ Register.

Bells
The tower unusually contains two peals of bells. The oldest peal of 6 is now unringable due to their height in the tower and the stresses that it put on the tower structure. There is one bell from 1754, two from 1771, one from 1790, one from 1864 and one from 1899. In 2017 a new peal of 10 bells was installed underneath the existing peal, but much lower in the tower. This peal were all cast by the Royal Eijsbouts bell foundry of Holland.

References

St Winnow
St Winnow